Rosati is an Italian surname.

Origins
The surname Rosati was first found in Italy, where bearers of Rosati were found since the Middle Ages in many areas of Italy, including Venetia, Emilia and the south. The spelling variations on the name which end in "o" are mostly from the south, whereas those that end in "i" are mostly from the north.

Geographical distribution
As of 2014, 72.5% of all known bearers of the surname Rosati were residents of Italy (frequency 1:2,761), 13.1% of the United States (1:90,585), 3.6% of Brazil (1:185,751), 2.4% of Canada (1:50,270), 2.2% of Argentina (1:62,218), 1.5% of Indonesia (1:291,940) and 1.5% of France (1:147,141).

In Italy, the frequency of the surname was higher than national average (1:2,761) in the following regions:
 1. Umbria (1:267)
 2. Molise (1:639)
 3. Lazio (1:718)
 4. Marche (1:796)
 5. Abruzzo (1:939)
 6. Tuscany (1:1,285)

People

 Alberto Rosati (1893–1971), Italian orientalist painter (son of orientalist Giulio)
 Allison Rosati (born 1963), American news anchor
 Antonio Rosati (born 1983), Italian professional footballer
 Carlo Rosati (1876–1929), Italian mathematician
 Carolina Rosati (1826–1905), Italian ballet dancer
 Christine Rosati Randall (born 1969), American politician
 Colette Rosati, American politician
 Dariusz Rosati (born 1946), Polish politician
 Diego Rosati (born 1978), Argentine judoka
 Fabio Rosati,  internet entrepreneur
 Gabriel Rosati (born 1966), Italian musician
 Giulio Rosati (1857–1917), Italian orientalist and academic painter
 Giuseppe Rosati (1752–1814), Italian physician, agronomist, philosopher and mathematician
 James Rosati (1911–1988), American sculptor
 Joseph Rosati (1789–1843), bishop
 Larry Rosati (1918–1997), American football coach
 Mariano Rosati (1879–1967), Italian politician
 Mike Rosati (born 1968), hockey player
 Richie Rosati, American recording artist, songwriter, television host, and actor
 Sandro Rosati (born 1958), Italian judoka
 Weronika Rosati (born 1984), Polish actress and model

References

Italian-language surnames
Surnames of Italian origin